The High Commissioner of Australia to Vanuatu is an officer of the Australian Department of Foreign Affairs and Trade and the head of the High Commission of the Commonwealth of Australia in Vanuatu. The position has the rank and status of an Ambassador Extraordinary and Plenipotentiary and is currently held by Sarah de Zoeten since January 2020. There has been a resident Australian High Commissioner in Vanuatu since July 1980 when the New Hebrides gained independence as a republic in the Commonwealth of Nations. Australia was the first country to establish a foreign mission in Port Vila, in 1978.

High Commissioners

References

Australia and the Commonwealth of Nations
 
Vanuatu
Vanuatu and the Commonwealth of Nations
Australia